The 1992 Australian Men's Hard Court Championships was an ATP men's tennis tournament held at Memorial Drive in Adelaide, Australia which was part of the World Series of the 1992 ATP Tour. The tournament was held from 30 December 1991 to 6 January 1992.

Goran Ivanišević won his 2nd title of the year, and the 8th of his career.

Finals

Singles

 Goran Ivanišević defeated  Christian Bergström 1–6, 7–6(7–5), 6–4

Doubles

 Goran Ivanišević /  Marc Rosset defeated  Mark Kratzmann /  Jason Stoltenberg 7–6, 7–6

References

External links
 ATP tournament profile

 
Australian Men's Hardcourt Championships
Next Generation Adelaide International
1990s in Adelaide
December 1991 sports events in Australia
January 1992 sports events in Australia